Stuart Carswell (born 9 September 1993) is a Scottish professional footballer, who plays as a midfielder for Scottish League Two side Dumbarton. Carswell has previously played for Motherwell, St Mirren, as well as Icelandic side Keflavík.

Career

Motherwell
Born in Bellshill, and a product of the Fir Park club's youth system, Carswell starred in the Motherwell under-19 side that finished second behind Celtic in the 2009–10 Scottish Premier League under-19 season. Carswell made his first team debut in the 0–0 draw against Hearts on 9 April 2011, playing the full 90 minutes.

On 3 February 2012, Carswell signed a new contract, keeping him at Motherwell until 2014. That was extended by a further year on 21 March 2013. On 2 June 2015, Motherwell announced that Carswell was amongst the players leaving the club, with his contract having expired.

St Mirren
Carswell signed a two-year contract with St Mirren on 29 June 2015. He decided to leave St Mirren at the end of the 2015–16 season having made 24 appearances for the club.

Keflavík
After leaving St Mirren, Carswell signed for Icelandic side Keflavík in July 2016, making his debut in a goalless draw with Leiknir R. Carswell left Keflavík at the end of the 2016 season wanting to progress his career back home.

Dumbarton
Carswell joined Scottish Championship side Dumbarton on 5 January 2017. After playing in every game following his arrival at 'The Rock' he signed a new deal in May 2017. He scored his first goal in senior football for the club, in his 151st game, with a free-kick winner in a Scottish Cup tie against Elgin City, his next goal also came in a 1-0 success, as he rifled in a 'magnificent' 25 yard strike in a 1–0 victory against Alloa Athletic in the Scottish Championship playoff final. Despite the club's relegation to Scottish League One Carswell signed a new one-year deal in June 2018. He scored his first goal in league football, the third in a 4–0 victory against East Fife, in October 2018. After impressing in both central midfield and central defence, Carswell was named Dumbarton's Player of the Year for the 2018–19 season. He renewed his deal with the club in June 2019 where he was appointed club captain. He made his 100th appearance for the club in August 2019. He extended his deal for a fifth season with the club in July 2020. Carswell extended his time at the Rock by another two seasons in June 2021. He finished the 2021–22 season with seven goals to his name - a career best, as the Sons were relegated to Scottish League Two. He was replaced as the club's captain in June 2022 by Ryan McGeever. Carswell scored the winning goal on his 200th appearance for the Sons, against Bonnyrigg Rose Athletic in September 2022.

Career statistics

References

External links
 
 

1993 births
Living people
People educated at Uddingston Grammar School
Footballers from Bellshill
Scottish footballers
Association football midfielders
Motherwell F.C. players
St Mirren F.C. players
Knattspyrnudeild Keflavík players
Scottish Premier League players
Scottish Professional Football League players
Expatriate footballers in Iceland
British expatriates in Iceland
Dumbarton F.C. players